Federico Santiago Garcia Di Bernardo (born April 6, 1984 in Santa Fe, Argentina) is an Argentine footballer currently playing for Gimnasia de Jujuy of the Primera B Nacional in Argentine.

Teams
  Colón de Santa Fe 2005-2007
  Gimnasia y Esgrima de Mendoza 2007
  Defensores de Belgrano 2008
  Temperley 2008
  The Strongest 2009-2011
  FBC Melgar 2012–2013
  Club Blooming 2014
  Gimnasia de Jujuy 2014-

External links
 Profile at BDFA 
 

1984 births
Living people
Argentine footballers
Argentine expatriate footballers
Gimnasia y Esgrima de Mendoza footballers
Club Atlético Colón footballers
The Strongest players
FBC Melgar footballers
Club Blooming players
Atlético de Rafaela footballers
Sarmiento de Resistencia footballers
Peruvian Primera División players
Argentine Primera División players
Expatriate footballers in Bolivia
Expatriate footballers in Peru
Association football defenders
Footballers from Santa Fe, Argentina